Naft Shahr (also known as Naft Shah, Naft Shāh, Naft-e Shah, Naft-e Shāh, Naft-i-Shah, Naft-ī-Shah) is a district of Qasr-e Shirin County, in Kermanshah Province of Iran. It is a sub-district of Sumar District. It is known for its oilfields. English explorers found oil in Naft Shahr for the first time in 1931. According to Mehr news agency, Naft Shahr which is the only active oilfield in Kermanshah Province has estimated oil reserves of 692 million barrels.

History

2010 incident
On Saturday 29 May 2010 fire broke out at well number 24 at the Naft Shahr oil field. It was put out in 38 days.

Oil field
Naft shahr oil field is located 72 km south of Qasr-e Shirin  and 230 km south west of Kermanshah. This field is a common field between Iran and Iraq and provides a portion of Kermanshah's refinery  feed. After Iraq-Iran war, reconstruction of the equipment at this refinery was incomplete and did not have safety equipment and measurement systems. The type of its oil is light crude oil.

See also
West Texas Intermediate
Sumar
Kalhor

References

External links
Reuters
Desalting project of Naft Shar  is performed by OEID.
Manifold project of Naft Shar  is performed by OEID.
http://travelingluck.com/Asia/Iran/Kerm%C4%81nsh%C4%81h/_122934_Naft%20Shahr.html

Qasr-e Shirin County